Jefferson College is the name of the following institutions of higher learning:

Jefferson College (Mississippi), a former college in Mississippi, listed on the National Register of Historic Places
Jefferson College (Missouri), a two-year community college in Hillsboro, Missouri
Jefferson Medical College, Philadelphia, Pennsylvania; now known as Thomas Jefferson University
Jefferson College (Pennsylvania), merged with Washington College (Pennsylvania) in 1865 to form Washington & Jefferson College
Jefferson College of Health Sciences, Roanoke, Virginia
Jefferson College (Louisiana), a former college in Convent, Louisiana, listed on the National Register of Historic Places

See also
Jefferson Community College (disambiguation)